Orocrambus tuhualis is a moth in the family Crambidae. It was described by Cajetan Felder, Rudolf Felder and Alois Friedrich Rogenhofer in 1875. It is endemic to New Zealand, where it has been recorded in the South Island and Wellington in the North Island. This species prefers habitat that consists of swampy areas.

The wingspan is 23–28 mm. Adults have been recorded on wing from November to December.

References

Crambinae
Moths described in 1875
Moths of New Zealand
Endemic fauna of New Zealand
Endemic moths of New Zealand